Frank Graham Klotz (born September 7, 1950) served as Under Secretary of Energy for Nuclear Security and Administrator for the National Nuclear Security Administration of the U.S. Department of Energy. He was confirmed for the position on April 8, 2014, and retired on January 20, 2018.

Until retiring in 2011, Klotz was a United States Air Force Lieutenant General who last served as the commander of Air Force Global Strike Command, Barksdale Air Force Base, Louisiana.

He was born in Lubbock, Texas.

Biography
General Klotz entered the Air Force in 1973 as a distinguished graduate of the United States Air Force Academy. He has commanded a Minuteman missile squadron, a missile launch task force, an operations group, a missile wing and a numbered air force. The general's staff assignments include tours on the Air Staff, in the Office of the Secretary of Defense and at the State Department as a White House Fellow. He has also served on the faculty of the Air Force Academy, at NATO headquarters in Brussels, at the American Embassy in Moscow, Russia, and as the Director for Nuclear Policy and Arms Control with the National Security Council at the White House. He has also served as the vice commander, Air Force Space Command, Peterson Air Force Base, Colorado. Prior to assuming command of Air Force Global Strike Command, General Klotz was Assistant Vice Chief of Staff and Director, Air Force Staff, Headquarters U.S. Air Force, Washington, D.C.

Between 2014 and 2018, Klotz served as Under Secretary of Energy for Nuclear Security, responsible for the management and operation of NNSA, as well as policy matters across the Department of Energy and NNSA enterprise in support of the president's nuclear security agenda.

Education
1973 Distinguished graduate, Bachelor of Science degree in international affairs, United States Air Force Academy, Colorado Springs, Colorado
1975 Master of Philosophy degree in international relations, Oxford University, Oxford, England
1980 Doctor of Philosophy degree in politics, Oxford University, Oxford, England
1980 Squadron Officer School, Maxwell AFB, Alabama
1988 National War College, Fort Lesley J. McNair, Washington, D.C.
1996 Senior Officials in National Security Program, Syracuse University, New York
2005 Leadership at the Peak, Center for Creative Leadership, Colorado Springs, Colorado
2006 Joint Flag Officer Warfighting Course, Maxwell AFB, Alabama

Assignments

October 1973 - July 1976, Rhodes scholar, Oxford University, Oxford, England
September 1976 - February 1978, international politico-military affairs officer, Directorate of Concepts, Headquarters U.S. Air Force, Washington, D.C.
March 1978 - July 1979, military assistant for special projects, Office of the Assistant Secretary of Defense for Manpower, Reserve Affairs and Logistics, The Pentagon, Washington, D.C.
July 1979 - August 1982, instructor, assistant professor and associate professor, Department of Political Science, U.S. Air Force Academy, Colorado Springs, Colo.
September 1982 - August 1983, White House Fellow and Special Assistant to the Deputy Secretary of State, Department of State, Washington, D.C.
September 1983 - January 1984, student, 4315th Combat Crew Training Squadron, Vandenberg AFB, California
January 1984 - August 1984, Minuteman Intercontinental Ballistic Missile combat crew commander, 446th Strategic Missile Squadron, Grand Forks AFB, North Dakota
August 1984 - July 1985, operations officer, 447th Strategic Missile Squadron, Grand Forks AFB, North Dakota
July 1985 - March 1986, Chief, Standardization and Evaluation Division, 321st Strategic Missile Wing, Grand Forks Air Force Base, N.D.
March 1986 - July 1987, Commander, 447th Strategic Missile Squadron, Grand Forks AFB, N.D.
July 1987 - June 1988, senior research fellow and student, National War College, Fort Lesley J. McNair, Washington, D.C.
July 1988 - February 1990, defense plans officer, U.S. Mission to NATO, Brussels, Belgium
February 1990 - August 1991, Chief, Nuclear Biological and Chemical Plans Branch, U.S. Mission to NATO, Brussels, Belgium
August 1991 - February 1993, Commander, 321st Operations Group, Grand Forks AFB, N.D.
February 1993 - December 1994, Director, Chief of Staff's Operations Group, Headquarters U.S. Air Force, Washington, D.C.
January 1995 - August 1996, Commander, 91st Missile Group (later redesignated 91st Missile Wing), Minot AFB, N.D.
August 1996 - August 1997, Director of Logistics, Headquarters Air Force Space Command, Peterson AFB, Colo.
August 1997 - August 1998, Military Fellow, Council on Foreign Relations, New York City, New York
September 1998 - July 1999, Defense Attaché Designate - Moscow, Arlington, Va.
July 1999 - June 2001, Defense Attaché, U.S. Defense Attaché Office, American Embassy, Moscow, Russia
July 2001 - May 2003, Director for Nuclear Policy and Arms Control, National Security Council, the White House, Washington, D.C.
May 2003 - October 2005, Commander, 20th Air Force, Air Force Space Command, and Commander, Task Force 214, U.S. Strategic Command, Francis E. Warren AFB, Wyoming
October 2005 - August 2007, Vice Commander, Air Force Space Command, Peterson AFB, Colo.
August 2007 - August 2009, Assistant Vice Chief of Staff and Director, Air Force Staff, Headquarters U.S. Air Force, Washington, D.C.
August 2009 – January 2011, Commander, Air Force Global Strike Command, Barksdale Air Force Base, Louisiana.

Awards and decorations

Other achievements
Member, Council on Foreign Relations
1973 Rhodes Scholar
1983 Named one of Ten Outstanding Young Men of America, U.S. Jaycees
2002 Heritage Hall of Fame Inductee, U.S. Air Force Academy Preparatory School
2006 Gen. Thomas D. White Space Trophy, Air Force Association

Effective dates of promotion

Publications
Space, Commerce, and National Security (New York: Council on Foreign Relations Press, 1998)
America on the Ice: Antarctic Policy Issues (Washington, D.C.: National Defense University Press, 1990) 
"The President and the Control of Nuclear Weapons," in Kozak and Cibolski, eds., The American Presidency: A Policy Perspective from Readings and Documents, (Chicago, Nelson Hall, 1985)
"Future Soviet-American Arms Control: Implications for NATO," in Kincade, et al., eds., Approaches to East-West Arms Control (Washington, D.C.: Arms Control Association, 1979)

See also
Air Force Headquarters
U.S. Air Force
National Nuclear Security Administration

References

External links

 
 

United States Air Force Academy alumni
United States Air Force generals
Recipients of the Air Force Distinguished Service Medal
Recipients of the Legion of Merit
American Rhodes Scholars
Living people
Recipients of the Defense Superior Service Medal
United States Department of Energy officials
White House Fellows
1950 births
United States air attachés
Obama administration personnel
Trump administration personnel